The West Cliff Railway, or West Cliff Lift, is a funicular railway located on West Cliff in the English seaside resort of Bournemouth. The line serves to link the seaside promenade and beach with the cliff top and the town behind.

Overview 
The line is owned and operated by Bournemouth, Christchurch and Poole Council and has the following technical parameters:

Technical Parameters 
Length: 
Gradient: 70.4%
Cars: 2
Capacity: 12 passengers per car
Configuration: Double track
Gauge: 
Traction: Electricity

History 
The West Cliff Railway was opened in 1908 by Bournemouth Corporation, some four months after the opening of the nearby East Cliff Railway. Like the East Cliff Railway, it was electrically operated from the start, with winding gear situated at the upper station driven by a  winding motor. The line was controlled by a driver at the upper station, assisted by an attendant at the lower station. Wooden-bodied cars were used.

The winding motor was replaced in the 1960s by a  three-phase motor. The cars were also replaced in the 1960s by aluminium-bodied cars intended to be interchangeable across all three of Bournemouth's surviving cliff railways. In 1987 the track was re-laid, and during the 1990s the line was further upgraded with the installation of an electronic control system.

Further nearby Funiculars 
The West Cliff Railway is one of three such cliff railways in Bournemouth, the other two being the East Cliff Railway (closed since 2016) and the Fisherman's Walk Cliff Railway. All three operate between April and October.

See also 
 List of funicular railways

References

External links 

 The official council page for the lifts, including prices
 Article on Bournemouth's Cliff Railways from The Heritage Trail web site 
 Article on Bournemouth's Cliff Railways from the Funicular Railways of the UK web site

Transport in Bournemouth
Funicular railways in the United Kingdom
Tourist attractions in Bournemouth
5 ft 6 in gauge railways in England